The Lost Empire is a 1984 American fantasy adventure film directed by Jim Wynorski. It was the first feature Wynorski directed.

It stars Melanie Vincz, Raven De La Croix, Angela Aames and Angus Scrimm. Its general release was in February 1985 after a limited release on June 22, 1984 in Wilmington, North Carolina.

Plot
The film opens at a jewelry shop in Chinatown, which contains a statue with one glowing red eye. Three masked figures kill the store's owner, then try to pry the eye free. The police arrive, and after a bloody fight, all of the intruders and all but one of the policemen are dead, with the lone survivor being seriously wounded.

The next day, children are being held hostage in an elementary school. A black-clad figure enters and takes on the terrorists, killing all three before revealing that she is Inspector Angel Wolfe (Melanie Vincz) of the L.A.P.D. A man enters the school room and Angel strikes him, breaking his nose and knocking him down, before realizing that the newcomer is Federal Agent Rick Stanton (Paul Coufos), an old friend. The two spend the night together.

The next morning, Angel receives a phone call telling her that her brother Rob (Bill Thornbury), is in the hospital after the jewelry shop confrontation. Angel and Rick rush to his side, and Rob gives Angel a strange star-shaped object and a cryptic message that "the Devil exists, and the Eye knows where." Rick recognizes the star and tells Angel about the legend of Lee Chuck (Angus Scrimm), who gained immortality at the price of giving the devil a new soul every day.

Angel pays a visit to the crime scene. As she gazes sadly at the spot on which her brother was wounded, the glowing red eye drops, unnoticed, from the statue into her handbag. Angel is startled by the sudden appearance of a mysterious Chinese man, who turns out to be Inspector Charles Chang (Art Hern). Chang tells Angel and Rick about the Eyes of Avatar, into which the Dragon-God placed enough power to allow anyone possessing them both to rule the world; and about his belief that Lee Chuck is both real, and in possession of one of the Eyes. He further tells them that Dr Sin Do (Angus Scrimm, in a dual role), the leader of a religious cult, is somehow involved with Lee Chuck.

After learning that Rob has died from his injuries, a grief-stricken Angel forces Rick to tell her more about Sin Do, who is recruiting women for an army of terrorists, luring them to his island by promising them fabulous wealth. When she hears that Sin Do only accepts women in trios, Angel travels to an Indian reservation to see Whitestar (Raven De La Croix), an old friend, and asks her to join the mission, to which Whitestar agrees. The third recruit is Heather McClure (Angela Aames), a criminal who Angel promises a parole in exchange for her help. The three sign on, and are flown by plane to Sin Do's mysterious island fortress of Golgatha.

Cast
Melanie Vincz as Angel Wolfe
Raven De La Croix as Whitestar
Angela Aames as Heather McClure
Paul Coufos as Rick Stanton
Robert Tessier as Koro
Angus Scrimm as Dr. Sin Do/Lee Chuck
Blackie Dammett as Prager
Linda Shayne as Cindy Blake
Kenneth Tobey as Capt. Hendry
Tom Rettig as Officer Robinson
Angelique Pettyjohn as Whiplash
Art Hern as Charles Chang
Anne Gaybis as Prison Referee
Bill Thornbury as Rob Wolfe

Production
Wynorksi had written a number of films for Roger Corman and this was his directorial debut. Finance came from a theatre owner, Henry Plitt. Wynorski said Plitt "wanted to make a low budget sci-fi action picture as a tax loss. I never knew that when I made the show, so I put my heart and soul into the project."

Corman did not finance the film, but Wynorski used Corman's studio to build many of the interior and exterior sets.

Release
Wynorski later said Corman "hated" the film "but acknowledged I'd put the camera in some very interesting places and the girls were pretty."

Wynorski says when the film "finally got completed, Plitt actually liked it enough to give it a wide theatrical release - where it actually made some money."

Home media
The film was released on VHS and Laserdisc by Lightning Video in 1984.

After this however the film's legal status became uncertain due to changes in ownership at Plitt Theatres. "It was always a deep regret of mine that my first film was caught in this limbo," says Wynorski "For years I did all kinds of detective work trying to get my film seen."

With the assistance of producer Bill Dever, Wynroski tracked down the owner of the assets of Plitt and re-acquired the rights. Some thirty years later, after being out of print for more than two decades, it was released on DVD in Region 1 by Polyscope Media in 2014, with Pegasus releasing the film in Region 2. Bonus features included an isolated soundtrack, still photo gallery, and commentary track by director Jim Wynorski.

Notes and references

External links
 
 

1984 films
1984 comedy films
1984 directorial debut films
1980s American films
1980s English-language films
1980s fantasy comedy films
1980s parody films
American fantasy adventure films
Films directed by Jim Wynorski
Films scored by Alan Howarth (composer)